Roberto Bargna (born 7 April 1972) is a former Italian paralympic cyclist who won a gold medal at the 2012 Summer Paralympics.

References

External links
 

1972 births
Living people
Paralympic cyclists of Italy
Paralympic gold medalists for Italy
Medalists at the 2012 Summer Paralympics
Paralympic medalists in cycling
Cyclists at the 2012 Summer Paralympics
Sportspeople from Como